Essor-Préchotain is a football club of Martinique, based in the northwestern town Le Prêcheur.

They play in the Martinique's first division, the Martinique Championnat National.

External links
 2007/08 Club info – Antilles-Foot
 Club info – French Football Federation

Football clubs in Martinique